Franz Kartz (born 17 March 1907, date of death unknown) was a German boxer who competed in the 1932 Summer Olympics. He was born in Mülheim an der Ruhr. In 1932 he was eliminated in the second round of the lightweight class after losing his bout to the upcoming gold medalist Lawrence Stevens.

References

1907 births
Year of death missing
Sportspeople from Mülheim
Lightweight boxers
Olympic boxers of Germany
Boxers at the 1932 Summer Olympics
German male boxers